Vitrea diaphana is a species of small, air-breathing land snail, a terrestrial pulmonate gastropod mollusk in the family Pristilomatidae.

This is the type species of the genus Vitrea.

Distribution 
The distribution of this species is alpine and southern-European.

 Czech Republic
 Ukraine

References

Pristilomatidae
Gastropods described in 1820